Bigger, Better Power Ballads II – The Greatest Driving Anthems in the World... Ever! is the 2nd edition in The Greatest Driving Anthems in the World... Ever! series, which is a part of The Best... Album in the World...Ever! brand.

The album has also been released in an Australian and a New Zealand edition. These two versions have an album cover similar to those album covers in the 3rd edition of The Greatest Driving Anthems in the World... Ever! series.

The 2nd edition of the Australian album series is called Bigger, Better Power Ballads, while the 3rd edition of the Australian album series is called Bigger, Better Power Ballads II.

Furthermore, there has been released a South African edition with 34 epic rock/pop love songs.

Track listing 1

Disc 1 
Queen – "Bohemian Rhapsody" 
Phil Collins – "In the Air Tonight"  
Scorpions – "Wind of Change"  
John Farnham – "You're the Voice"  
Boston – "More Than a Feeling"  
Whitesnake – "Here I Go Again"  
Toto – "Hold the Line"  
Cher – "If I Could Turn Back Time"  
Alice Cooper – "Poison"  
Mr. Mister – "Kyrie"  
Marillion – "Kayleigh"  
Tina Turner – "What's Love Got to Do with It"  
Foreigner – "Waiting for a Girl Like You"  
Marc Cohn – "Walking in Memphis"  
Lonestar – "Amazed"  
Richard Marx – "Hazard"  
REO Speedwagon – "Can't Fight This Feeling"  
Bonnie Tyler – "It's a Heartache"

Disc 2 
Prince – "Purple Rain" (Full Length Version)  
Meat Loaf – "Bat Out of Hell" (Full Length Version)  
Simple Minds – "Alive and Kicking"  
Belinda Carlisle – "(We Want) The Same Thing"  
Survivor – "Burning Heart"  
The Babys – "Every Time I Think of You"  
Bad Company – "Feel Like Makin' Love"  
Nickelback – "Someday"  
Gary Moore – "Still Got the Blues (For You)"   
Journey – "Open Arms"  
Chicago – "Hard Habit to Break"  
Roxette – "Listen to Your Heart"  
Frankie Goes to Hollywood – "The Power of Love"  
David Bowie – "Life on Mars?"  
Nilsson – "Without You"  
The Moody Blues – "Nights in White Satin"

Track listing 2

Disc 1 
Queen – "Who Wants to Live Forever" 
Scorpions – "Still Loving You" 
Boston – "More Than a Feeling" 
Whitesnake – "Is This Love"  
Thunder – "Love Walked In" 
Journey – "Open Arms"
Cher – "If I Could Turn Back Time"
Pat Benatar – "Love Is a Battlefield"  
Foreigner – "Waiting for a Girl Like You" 
Meat Loaf – "I'd Do Anything For Love (But I Won't Do That)" 
Marillion – "Kayleigh" 
The Moody Blues – "Nights in White Satin" 
David Bowie – "Life on Mars?" 
Ultravox – "Vienna" 
Simple Minds – "Alive and Kicking"
The Waterboys – "The Whole of the Moon"

Disc 2 
Peter Gabriel – "Don't Give Up"
Duran Duran – "Ordinary World" 
REO Speedwagon – "Can't Fight This Feeling"  
Richard Marx – "Hazard" 
Roxette – "Listen to Your Heart" 
Jon Secada – "Angel" 
Mr. Mister – "Broken Wings" 
Mike + The Mechanics – "Over My Shoulder" 
Genesis – "Follow You Follow Me" 
Tina Turner – "What's Love Got to Do with It" 
Prince – "Purple Rain"
Marc Cohn – "Walking in Memphis"
Kim Carnes – "Bette Davis Eyes" 
Toto – "Hold the Line"
Survivor – "Burning Heart"
Gary Moore – "Still Got the Blues (For You)"

Track listing 3

Disc 1 
Queen – "Who Wants to Live Forever" 
Scorpions – "Still Loving You" 
Boston – "More Than a Feeling" 
Whitesnake – "Is This Love"  
Thunder – "Love Walked In" 
Bonnie Tyler – "Total Eclipse of the Heart"
T'Pau – "China in Your Hand"
Pat Benatar – "Love Is a Battlefield"  
Cutting Crew – "(I Just) Died in Your Arms" 
Meat Loaf – "I'd Do Anything for Love (But I Won't Do That)" 
Marillion – "Kayleigh" 
Poison – "Every Rose Has Its Thorn" 
Billy Idol – "Eyes Without a Face" 
Ultravox – "Vienna" 
Simple Minds – "Don't You (Forget About Me)"
The Waterboys – "The Whole of the Moon"

Disc 2 
Peter Gabriel – "Don't Give Up"
Duran Duran – "Ordinary World" 
Sinéad O'Connor – "Nothing Compares 2 U"  
Richard Marx – "Hazard" 
Roxette – "Listen to Your Heart" 
Jon Secada – "Angel" 
Mr. Mister – "Broken Wings" 
Mike + The Mechanics – "Over My Shoulder" 
Genesis – "Follow You Follow Me" 
Tina Turner – "What's Love Got to Do with It" 
Huey Lewis and the News – "The Power of Love"
Starship – "Nothing's Gonna Stop Us Now"
Kim Carnes – "Bette Davis Eyes" 
John Waite – "Missing You"
Gary Moore – "Still Got the Blues (For You)"

Australia track listing

Disc 1 
Queen – "We Are the Champions"  
Survivor – "Eye of the Tiger"  
Simple Minds – "Don't You (Forget About Me)"  
Cher – "If I Could Turn Back Time"  
Foreigner – "I Want to Know What Love Is" 
Sinéad O'Connor – "Nothing Compares 2 U"  
The Cars – "Drive"  
Tina Turner – "We Don't Need Another Hero (Thunderdome)"  
Maroon 5 – "She Will Be Loved" 
Belinda Carlisle – "Summer Rain"  
Nickelback – "Far Away"  
Anastacia – "Left Outside Alone" 
Cutting Crew – "(I Just) Died in Your Arms"  
Kelly Clarkson – "Because of You"  
Scorpions – "Wind of Change"  
Bonnie Tyler – "Total Eclipse of the Heart"  
Lonestar – "Amazed"  
Meat Loaf featuring Marion Raven – "It's All Coming Back to Me Now"

Disc 2 
Europe – "The Final Countdown"   
Pat Benatar – "Love Is a Battlefield"  
Bad English – "When I See You Smile" 
Whitesnake – "Is This Love"   
Jimmy Barnes – "Too Much Ain't Enough Love"  
Concrete Blonde – "Joey"   
Cheap Trick – "The Flame" 
The Waterboys – "The Whole of the Moon"  
Maria McKee – "Show Me Heaven"  
Poison – "Every Rose Has Its Thorn" 
3 Doors Down – "Here Without You"  
Shania Twain – "From This Moment On"  
Marc Cohn – Walking in Memphis  
Train – "Drops of Jupiter"
Live – "Lightning Crashes"  
4 Non Blondes – "What's Up?"  
Roy Orbison – "Crying"  
The Righteous Brothers – "Unchained Melody"  
Bette Midler – "The Rose"

Disc 3 
Sick Puppies – "All the Same"  
Extreme – "More Than Words" 
Roxette – "Fading Like a Flower (Every Time You Leave)"  
Alice Cooper – "Poison"  
The Heights – How Do You Talk to an Angel  
Gary Moore – "Still Got The Blues (For You)"  
John Waite – "Missing You"   
Billy Idol – "Eyes Without a Face"  
Starship – "Nothing's Gonna Stop Us Now"  
Mr. Mister – "Broken Wings"  
Chicago – "Hard to Say I'm Sorry"   
Eric Carmen – "All By Myself"  
Nilsson – "Without You" 
Sam Brown – "Stop!"  
Ronan Keating – "If Tomorrow Never Comes"  
Five for Fighting – "Superman (It's Not Easy)"   
The Calling – "Wherever You Will Go"  
Limp Bizkit – "Behind Blue Eyes"  
Duran Duran – "Ordinary World"

New Zealand track listing

Disc 1 
Queen – "The Show Must Go On" 
Moving Pictures – "What About Me" 
Wilson Phillips – "Hold On" 
John Farnham – "You're the Voice" 
Mike Reno & Ann Wilson – "Almost Paradise" (Love Theme from Footloose) 
Will to Power – "Baby I Love Your Way/Free Bird" 
Roxette – "Listen to Your Heart" 
Berlin – "Take My Breath Away" (Love Theme from 'Top Gun') 
Tina Turner – "We Don't Need Another Hero (Thunderdome)" 
Belinda Carlisle – "Leave a Light On" 
Johnny Hates Jazz – "Turn Back the Clock" 
The Bangles – "Eternal Flame" 
Shakespear's Sister – "Stay" 
Breathe – "Hands to Heaven" 
Maria McKee – "Show Me Heaven" 
Peter Cetera – "Glory of Love" (Theme from 'The Karate Kid II') 
Sheriff – "When I'm with You" 
Joe Cocker & Jennifer Warnes – "Up Where We Belong"

Disc 2 
Whitesnake – "Here I Go Again" 
Steve Perry – "Oh Sherrie" 
Alias – "More Than Words Can Say" 
Heart – "What About Love?" 
Nelson – "(Can't Live Without Your) Love and Affection" 
Ugly Kid Joe – "Cats in the Cradle" 
Firehouse – "Love of a Lifetime" 
Mr. Big – "To Be with You" 
Night Ranger – "Sister Christian" 
REO Speedwagon – "Can't Fight This Feeling" 
Noiseworks – "R.I.P. (Millie)" 
Meat Loaf – "Rock and Roll Dreams Come Through" 
Winger – "Miles Away" 
Warrant – "Heaven" 
Poison – "Something to Believe In" 
The Heights – "How Do You Talk to an Angel" 
Thunder – "Low Life in High Places" 
Gerard McMann – "Cry, Little Sister" (Theme from 'The Lost Boys')

South Africa track listing

Disc 1 
Freddie Mercury – "The Great Pretender" 
George Michael – "Jesus to a Child" 
Tina Turner – "What's Love Got to Do with It" 
Peter Gabriel & Kate Bush – "Don't Give Up" 
Blue – "If You Come Back" 
Mike + The Mechanics – "All I Need Is a Miracle"
Macy Gray – "I Try" 
Hothouse Flowers – "I Can See Clearly Now" 
The Pretenders – "Hymn to Her" 
Sophie B Hawkins – "Right Beside You" 
Duran Duran – "Ordinary World" 
Joshua Kadison – "Beautiful in My Eyes" 
Jann Arden – "Insensitive"
Blessid Union of Souls – "I Believe"
Scorpions – "Wind of Change"
Bell, Book & Candle – "Rescue Me" 
Nickelback – "How You Remind Me"

Disc 2 
Tears for Fears – "Woman in Chains" 
All Saints – "Never Ever" 
Bryan Ferry & Roxy Music – "Jealous Guy" 
Roxette – "Listen to Your Heart" 
Mr. Mister – "Kyrie" 
Chesney Hawkes – "The One and Only"
The Waterboys – "The Whole of the Moon" 
Huey Lewis and the News – "The Power of Love" 
Simple Minds – "Promised You a Miracle" 
T'Pau – "China in Your Hand"
Sinéad O'Connor – "Nothing Compares 2 U" 
Kate Bush – "Babooshka"
Divinyls – "I Touch Myself"
Feargal Sharkey – "A Good Heart"
Martha Davis – "Don't Tell Me the Time" 
Melanie C – "Never Be the Same Again" 
Pat Benatar – "Love Is a Battlefield"

References

External links
 Bigger, Better Power Ballads II - Track list 1 (front- and backcover) 
 [ Bigger, Better Power Ballads II – Track list 1]
 Bigger, Better Power Ballads II - Track list 2
 Bigger, Better Power Ballads II - Track list 3 front and back cover 
 Bigger, Better Power Ballads - Track list Australia or [ Bigger, Better Power Ballads – Track list ]
 Bigger, Better Power Ballads - Track list New Zealand
 Bigger, Better Power Ballads II - Track list South Africa

2004 compilation albums
2006 compilation albums
2007 compilation albums